West Texas Roller Derby is a women's flat track roller derby league based in Lubbock, Texas. Founded in 2007, the league currently consists of a single team, which competes against teams from other leagues. West Texas is a member of the Women's Flat Track Derby Association (WFTDA).

History
West Texas was founded as the West Texas Roller Dollz in September 2007. The league's first bout was held in May 2008, attracting 2,000 fans, and it was accepted as a member of the Women's Flat Track Derby Association (WFTDA) in August 2008.

WFTDA competition
West Texas was the eighth seed for the 2009 WFTDA South Central Regional Tournament. West Texas lost their three games, 109-79 to No Coast Derby Girls, 212-49 to Nashville Rollergirls and 134-82 to Memphis Roller Derby and finished the weekend in tenth place.

Rankings

References

Sports teams in Lubbock, Texas
Roller derby leagues established in 2007
Roller derby leagues in Texas
Women's Flat Track Derby Association Division 3
2007 establishments in Texas
Women's sports in Texas